Coon Rapids–Bayard Community School District is a rural public school district headquartered in Coon Rapids, Iowa.

The district serves Coon Rapids and Bayard. Portions of the district are in Carroll, Guthrie, Greene, and Audubon counties.

The district was established on July 1, 1988, by the merger of the Bayard and Coon Rapids school districts.

Schools
Coon Rapids–Bayard Elementary School
Coon Rapids–Bayard Secondary School

Coon Rapids–Bayard Secondary School

Athletics
The Crusaders compete in the Rolling Valley Conference in the following sports:

Baseball
Basketball (boys and girls)
Cross country (boys and girls)
Football
Softball
Track and field (boys and girls)
Volleyball
Wrestling

See also
List of school districts in Iowa
List of high schools in Iowa

References

External links
 Coon Rapids–Bayard Community School District

School districts in Iowa
Education in Carroll County, Iowa
Education in Greene County, Iowa
Education in Guthrie County, Iowa
Education in Audubon County, Iowa
1988 establishments in Iowa
School districts established in 1988